Gelechia allomima is a moth of the family Gelechiidae. It is found in the Democratic Republic of Congo (North Kivu).

References

Moths described in 1938
Gelechia